The following are the football (soccer) events of the year 1911 throughout the world.

Events
Hajduk Split is founded.
Olimpija Ljubljana founded.
 Zamalek Sporting Club (Cairo) founded.
Valur founded.
Brescia Calcio founded.
FK Austria Wien founded.

Winners club national championship 
Argentina: Alumni Athletic Club
Belgium: Cercle Brugge
England: Manchester United
Germany: Viktoria 89 Berlin
Hungary: Ferencváros
Italy: Pro Vercelli
Luxembourg: Sporting Club
Netherlands: Sparta Rotterdam
Paraguay: Club Nacional
Scotland: For fuller coverage, see 1910-11 in Scottish football.
Scottish Division One – Rangers
Scottish Division Two – Dumbarton
Scottish Cup – Celtic
Sweden: AIK
Uruguay: C.U.R.C.C.
Greece: Panellinios Podosfairikos Omilos Athens

International tournaments
1911 British Home Championship (28 January – 3 April 1911)

Sir Thomas Lipton Trophy:
  West Auckland
  Juventus
  Torino
  FC Zürich

Births
May 14 – Leen Vente, Dutch footballer (died 1989)
November 3 – Kick Smit, Dutch footballer (died 1974)      *November 11 –ST Ukraine Lviv Dutch footballer (died 1944)

Deaths 
 December 20 – William McGregor, Scottish football administrator, former FA and Aston Villa F.C.  chairman, regarded as the founder of The Football League. (65)

References 

 
Association football by year